White Rock is a community in Kings County, Nova Scotia near the town of Wolfville.

The Stiver's Falls Hydroelectric Plant, also known as the old White Rock generating station, was built nearby in 1919 on the Gaspereau River, about 3 km south-west of Wolfville, and produced electricity for the first time on 25 February 1920. It had a capacity of 375 horsepower 280 kilowatts. The original machinery was replaced in 1950 with a 3,600 kW generating plant, and the dam replaced in 1994.

Notable residents 
 The Goler clan are a clan of poor, incestuous rural families in Canada, known for inter-generational poverty and the conviction in the 1980s of a large number of family members for sexual abuse and incest.
 Justin Schofield was named the top pitcher of the tournament at the Canadian senior men's softball championship in Quebec in 2015.

Weather

See also
 Goler clan

References

External links 
   White Rock Community Center

Communities in Kings County, Nova Scotia